The 2002 Barber Dodge Pro Series season was the seventeenth season of the series. All drivers used Dodge powered Michelin shod Reynard 98E chassis.

Race calendar and results

Final standings

References

Barber Dodge Pro Series
Barber Dodge